Anacortes High School is a high school in Anacortes,  Washington, United States. It is operated by  Anacortes School District, also known as Anacortes School District No. 103.

A building project at the school led to a claim from Sturgeon Electric, an electrical construction subcontractor, over unexpected expenses.

References

External links

Washington_(state)_school_stubs
High schools in Skagit County, Washington